Power Outage may refer to:
Power outage, a term which refers to electrical power failure
 "Power Outage" (Charmed), an episode of the television series Charmed
 "Power Outage" (The Flash), an episode of the television series The Flash